Dhathuputhri (transl: Adoptive Daughter) is a Malayalam language soap opera which premiered on Mazhavil Manorama channel, starring  Swasika Vijay as the main protagonist.

Plot summary 
The story of Dathuputhri revolves around a village girl named Kanmani. She is the lone survivor of a landslide and gets adopted by the State government. She reaches the family of Nandakishore (District Collector), and Hema, who had lost their daughter. The further reappearance of their lost girl, Meenu makes things take an abrupt turn. The story goes into a different track when a girl is reluctant to share the honours and privileges that she had been enjoying once in her homestead and society, with her monozygotic sister.

.

Cast
  Swasika Vijay as Kanmani/Meenu
 Meena Kumari as Hema
Risabava as Nandakishore
 Girish Nambiar as Chetan Rai
G.K.Pillai as Grandfather
 Sangeetha Mohan as Vijaynirmala
 Beena Antony as Kanchana
 Bindhu Ramakrishnan as Thankachi Amma
 Adityan Jayan as Sathyan
 Ambarish as SreeKuttan
 Girish Nambiar as Chethan Rai IAS
 Kollam Thulasi as Minister
 Ambika Mohan as Vasundhara
Darshana Das as Radhika
 Tony
 Sneha Nambiar
 Reena

References

Malayalam-language television shows
2015 Indian television series debuts
Mazhavil Manorama original programming